Michael Reardon may refer to:

Michael Reardon (climber) (1965–2007), American climber, filmmaker and writer
Michael Reardon (actor), foreign actor who starred in Colpo rovente 1970
Michael Reardon (architect), English architect, historic building consultant and interior designer
Michael Reardon (activist) (1876–1945), political activist
Michael J. Reardon, American cardiac surgeon and medical researcher